"Seisyun" is the thirty-ninth single by the Japanese band Tokio, released on November 28, 2007. It topped the Oricon weekly charts and charted for twelve weeks. The song "Seisyun" was used as the theme song to Utahime, a drama show Tomoya Nagase starred in.

Track listing
"Seisyun" was released in three different versions:

CD Normal Edition

Limited Edition A

Limited Edition B

References

2007 songs
Tokio (band) songs
Japanese television drama theme songs
Songs written by Tsuyoshi Nagabuchi
2007 singles